Interstate 90 (I-90) in the US state of Wyoming traverses the northeastern corner of the state, passing through the cities and communities of Sheridan, Buffalo, and Gillette.

Route description
I-90 enters Wyoming from Montana and heads south concurrent with US Highway 87 (US 87) through hilly grasslands. It curves to the southeast and meets an interchange that serves the small community of Parkman. Continuing southeast, the highway intersects US 14 at a diamond interchange. US 14 joins I-90 and US 87, and the three routes curve east. After the freeway bends back to the southeast, it intersects the eastern end of Wyoming Highway 345 (WYO 345), then crosses the BNSF Railway (formerly the Chicago, Burlington and Quincy Railroad) and the Tongue River. The highway serves as the western terminus of WYO 339 and then passes over WYO 338 without an intersection just before it crosses Goose Creek. Just south of Goose Creek, US 14 and US 87 split off to the south of I-90 via a trumpet interchange. This road is also signed as a I-90 Business (I-90 Bus.).

The freeway turns due south and skirts around the eastern edge of Sheridan. It intersects WYO 336, then crosses over the BNSF Railway again, before intersecting US 14 farther south. South of Sheridan, I-90 continues to travel south roughly parallel to US 87. The highway intersects WYO 342 and Prairie Dog Creek Road at diamond interchanges before US 87 merges back into and becomes concurrent with I-90. The highway runs southwest of Lake Desmet. Here, it meets Lake Ridge Road, which leads to the lake.

Southeast of Lake Desmet, I-90/US 87 comes to a diamond interchange with Rock Creek Road. It then intersects US 87 Bus. and I-25 Bus. at an incomplete diamond interchange; only traffic heading southbound can exit, and traffic from the business loops can only access I-90 northbound. Just southeast of this interchange, I-90 meets the northern terminus of I-25. US 87 follows I-25 southbound toward Buffalo, while I-90 bends to the southeast and intersects US 16 at a diamond interchange.

Southeast of Buffalo, I-90 continues in a general southeasterly direction through hilly grasslands. The highway intersects several minor farm roads, then curves to the northeast toward Gillette. Just west of the city, the freeway turns due east. Within Gillette, I-90 comes to a diamond interchange with WYO 50 and its own business loop, then dips to the southeast and meets another diamond interchange, this one with WYO 59. I-90 then has one last exit in Gillette: a partial cloverleaf interchange with US 14, US 16, and WYO 51. The first two of those routes become concurrent with I-90 and follow it east.

The freeway crosses the BNSF Railway and then turns to the east. It meets a diamond interchange with Garner Lake Road, then leaves Gillette and intersects American Road before crossing the BNSF Railway again. The highway travels east, parallel to WYO 51 and then meets Adon Road, then curves to the southeast toward Moorcroft. I-90 has two exits in Moorcroft; at the first exit, US 14 and US 16 leave I-90, and I-90's business loop begins. The highway passes over US 14 with no access and then meets its second exit in the city: the eastern terminus of its business loop. East of this exit, I-90 leaves the city.

East of Moorcroft, I-90 intersects several more minor rural roads while it bends to the northeast toward Sundance. As it nears Sundance, it shares a diamond interchange with US 14 and I-90 Bus. The route then curves to the east and enters the city, intersecting WYO 585 at a diamond interchange. I-90 then meets US 14 and the eastern terminus of I-90 Bus.; the former becomes concurrent with I-90, and the two routes head northeast, leaving Sundance. Northeast of Sundance, I-90/US 14 parallels the former alignment of the latter. The highway intersects Sundance-Moskee Road, then bends north and meets WYO 111. I-90/US 14 then has one last exit, with Sand Creek Road, before crossing into South Dakota.

History

During early planning of I-90, the town of Clearmont (on US 14) filed suit against the Wyoming Highway Commission for an alleged violation of a 1955 state law that required approval from voters for the construction of a bypass. Clearmont had previously been selected for a rerouting of US 14 and US 16 in 1957, which was seen as a precursor to a later Interstate Highway; the straighter route was also supported by business groups in Sheridan. The injunction was denied by a state district judge in 1959 and was appealed to the Wyoming Supreme Court, which ruled in favor of the state highway commission in December 1960.

Construction of I-90 in northwestern Wyoming began during the appeals process, with  under active contracts for grading and site preparation by December 1960. The bypass of Sheridan, one of the first major sections of the freeway, was opened to traffic on July 28, 1962. The longest stretch,  between Buffalo and Gillette, was dedicated on October 14, 1962, and cost $18.4 million to construct. It was initially a two-lane limited-access road that was later upgraded to four lanes. The final link in the  section between Sheridan and Buffalo was opened in December 1968.

It was also the final section of the Interstate Highway System to be completed in the state. The Ranchester section, which had been completed for three months but delayed to coincide with work across the border in Montana, was dedicated by the governors of Montana and Wyoming in a joint ceremony.

Exit list

Business routes
Business routes are present in Sheridan (also carries US 14 Bus. and US 87 Bus.), Buffalo, Gillette, and Sundance (also part of US 14).

References

External links

90
 Wyoming
Transportation in Sheridan County, Wyoming
Transportation in Johnson County, Wyoming
Transportation in Campbell County, Wyoming
Transportation in Crook County, Wyoming